Zsigmond Sarkadi Nagy (born 20 June 1955) is a Hungarian former cyclist. He competed in the team pursuit event at the 1980 Summer Olympics.

References

External links
 

1955 births
Living people
Hungarian male cyclists
Olympic cyclists of Hungary
Cyclists at the 1980 Summer Olympics
Cyclists from Budapest